Raymond Walter Terzynski (November 27, 1919 – August 18, 1983) was an American professional basketball player. He played for the Oshkosh All-Stars in the National Basketball League for three seasons and averaged 3.7 points per game.

References

1919 births
1983 deaths
American men's basketball players
United States Army personnel of World War II
Basketball players from Wisconsin
Forwards (basketball)
Oshkosh All-Stars players
People from Rhinelander, Wisconsin
Military personnel from Wisconsin
Wisconsin–Stevens Point Pointers men's basketball players